On personal computers with numeric keypads that use Microsoft operating systems, such as Windows, many characters that do not have a dedicated key combination on the keyboard may nevertheless be entered using the Alt code (the Alt numpad input method). This is done by pressing and holding the  key, then typing a number on the keyboard's numeric keypad that identifies the character and then releasing .

History and description

MS DOS
On IBM PC compatible personal computers from the 1980s, the BIOS allowed the user to hold down the  key and type a decimal number on the keypad. It would place the corresponding code into the keyboard buffer so that it would look (almost) as if the code had been entered by a single keystroke. Applications reading keystrokes from the BIOS would behave according to what action they associate with that code. Some would interpret the code as a command, but often it would be interpreted as a code to be placed on the screen at the location of the cursor, thus displaying the corresponding 8-bit character from the current code page. On the original IBM PC this was CP437. In most cases typing a number greater than 255 produced the character associated with the remainder after the number is divided by 256.

Some Eastern European, Arabic and Asian computers used other hardware code pages, and MS-DOS was able to switch between them at runtime with commands like  KEYB, CHCP or MODE. This causes the Alt combinations to produce different characters (as well as changing the display of any previously-entered text in the same manner). A common choice in locales using variants of the Latin alphabet was CP850, which provided more Latin character variants. (There were, however, many more code pages; for a more complete list, see code page).

PC keyboards designed for non-English use included other methods of inserting these characters, such as national keyboard layouts, the AltGr key or dead keys, but the Alt key was the only method of inserting some characters and the only method that was the same on all machines, so it remained very popular. This input method is emulated by many pieces of software (such as later versions of MS-DOS and Windows) that do not use the BIOS keyboard decoding.

In the ASCII standard, the numbers 0-31 and 127 are assigned to control characters, but MS DOS did not interpret the numbers this way. For instance, code point 7 is assigned to BEL.

Windows

The Alt codes had become so well known and memorized by users that Microsoft decided to preserve them, even though it used a new and different set of code pages for Windows, such as CP1252. The old code pages were called OEM code pages; the new ones are called Windows code pages, The familiar Alt+number combinations produced codes from the OEM code page (for example, CP437 in the United States), matching the results from MS-DOS. But prefixing a leading zero (0) to the number (usually meaning 4 digits) produced the character specified by the newer Windows code page, allowing them to be typed as well.

The numbers 0 –31 and 127 are control characters in the Windows code pages. Typing these numbers with a leading zero is ignored.

Before Unicode was introduced, most Windows software could only create text  using the repertoire of characters available in a single code page. Characters that did not exist in that page (such as a line-drawing graphic from the OEM page when the software was using the Windows code page) could not be inserted, and either were ignored or produced an unexpected character. Modern software uses Unicode, which assigns numbers (code points) to all the characters in all the code pages. The software has access to the glyphs corresponding to all the code points in the supported fonts, so it can produce the character specified by any Alt code less than 256 whether zero-prefixed or non-zero-prefixed.

Transition to Unicode
When Windows later transitioned to Unicode, there was a desire to extend the Alt codes to allow entry of any Unicode code point. Numbers greater or equal to 256 pick the corresponding Unicode code point (lower numbers continue to pick characters from the OEM or ANSI code pages, but if 0 is prefixed the ANSI code page greatly resembles the first 256 characters of Unicode). Some applications (RichEdit-based) like Word 2010, Wordpad,  and PSPad operate this way. Other Windows applications, including Notepad, Chrome, Firefox, and Microsoft Edge interpret all numbers greater than 255 modulo 256.

Because most Unicode documentation and the Character Map accessory show the code points in hex, not decimal, a variation of Alt codes was developed to allow the numbers to be typed in hex (using the main keyboard for –). To enable it, a user must set or create a string type value called EnableHexNumpad in the registry key HKEY_CURRENT_USER\Control Panel\Input Method, assign the value data 1 to it, and then reboot or log out/in. A leading  then indicates hex input, for example  will produce  (e with caron).

Problems
If  is disabled, attempting an Alt code may cause unexpected results in some applications, due to the controls used on the same key.

Many laptops do not have a separate numeric keypad, but some may provide numpad input by holding a modifier key (typically labelled "Fn"); thus one must press and hold both  and  keys while entering the character code.

One limitation of the Alt code feature is that the  key and the numpad keys being used to enter the code must both be on the same keyboard device. Users with keyboards that lack a numpad (e.g. tenkeyless designs) cannot use a separate numpad device to enter Alt codes while holding the  key on their main keyboard.

Other operating systems
The Alt key method does not work on ChromeOS, macOS, Linux or other operating systems and there is no readily-accessible evidence of interest in replicating it, due to its including the 1980s IBM PC character encoding as part of its definition. However, numeric entry of Unicode characters is possible in most Unix or Unix-like OSs by typing , (release) then the hex number, then the space bar or enter key. For example, 
 for the registered trademark symbol , type ; 
 for the  no entry sign , type

Alternatives

Alternative systems exist for users to make characters without selecting them by number, for example using a popup window that lets a user choose the desired character by clicking on it. Examples include the Windows Character Map or the Insert Character facility in MsOffice. See Unicode input for more.

List of codes

See also
 Combining character
 Compose key for other operating systems
 Keyboard layout
 List of Unicode characters
 Numeric character reference

Notes

References

Character encoding
Computer keyboards
Input methods

de:Alt (Taste)#Alt-Code